Khamis Martin (born October 5, 1986) is a South Sudanese footballer who currently plays as a midfielder.

International career
He has made at least one senior appearances for South Sudan against Kenya in the 2012 CECAFA Cup. Previously, he played one international for Sudan in 2010.

References

Living people
1986 births
South Sudanese footballers
South Sudan international footballers
Sudan international footballers
Dual internationalists (football)
Association football midfielders